Spilomyia abdominalis is a species of Hoverfly in the family Syrphidae.

Distribution
Japan.

References

Eristalinae
Insects described in 1968
Diptera of Asia